Renland is a peninsula in eastern Greenland. It is a part of the Sermersooq municipality. Despite its proximity to the coast Renland has an ice cap climate with bitterly cold winters and very low maximum temperatures in the summer. 

Renland was named after the reindeer which were found formerly in the area, but disappeared around the early 20th century.

Geography
Renland is surrounded to the north by the Nordvestfjord of the Scoresby Sound, to the south by the 6 to 10 km wide Ofjord and to the southwest by the Rype Fjord. To the west the peninsula is attached to the mainland and to the northwest lies Th. Sørensen Land and beyond it the Hinksland peninsula. Nathorst Land lies to the north, across the Nordvestfjord

The Bjorne Islands lie off its eastern shore and to the south across the Ofjord lie the islands of Milneland and Storo. Renland has its own ice cap on a high plateau in the middle of the peninsula and in the southern part there are glacial lakes separated by glacial tongues. 

This wide and desolate place is a popular destination for mountain climbing owing to its steep slopes, massive rocky crags and jagged peaks. Constable Point (Nerlerit Inaat) is the closest airport.

See also
Liverpool Land
Milne Land
Scoresby Land

Bibliography

References

External links 
 TrailerGreenland Swiss Renland Expedition
 The Renland ice core. A Northern Hemisphere record of aerosol composition over 120,000 years
Peninsulas of Greenland
Scoresby Sound